Israeli Diving Federation (TIDF) is a non-governmental SCUBA diving training organization based in Israel.

History
The Gulf of Eilat is one of the most popular diving destinations in the world. About 250,000 dives are performed annually in Eilat's 11 km Gulf of Aqaba coastline, and diving represents 10% of the tourism income in this area.

TIDF was founded in 1966 by ex-Navy diving instructors and members of an underwater archaeological society. In the 1970s the federation began certifying dive instructors in the wake of numerous diving accidents, especially in Sinai peninsula, which at that time was under Israeli control. In 1979, Knesset passed the Recreational Diving Law (Heb:חוק הצלילה הספורטיבית), which regulates training, certification and practice of diving in Israel. The federation was its enforcing body until 1997.

Courses and certification

  – A basic diving certificate available from age 12.
  – The one-star diver certificate is parallel to Open Water Diver of SSI/PADI. This level entitles its owner to perform dives up to  accompanied by another diver with Two-stars or higher certification.
  – This level is parallel to Advanced Open Water Diver of SSI/PADI.
  – This level is parallel to SSI Master Diver.
  – This level is parallel to Assistant Instructor Diver of SSI/PADI.

EUF Certification

TIDF obtained CEN certification from the EUF certification body in 2012.

Underwater sports
TIDF currently offers the following underwater sports – Apnoea, Aquathlon (also known as underwater wrestling) and Sport Diving.

See also

References

External links
 Recreational Diving Law in Israel 
 Israeli Diving Federation 

Diving
Underwater diving training organizations
1966 establishments in Israel
Sports organizations established in 1966